Greek Orthodox Metropolitan of Beirut and Exarch of Phoenicia is the head of the Greek Orthodox Archdiocese of Beirut and Exarchate of Phoenicia in the Syrian-based patriarchate of the Eastern Orthodox Church of Antioch. The present Archbishop is Elias Audi (1980-)

Former Archbishops
 Makarios (1783 being mentioned)
 Archimandrite Messurah (appointed in 1902)
 Gerasimos Mesarra (?)
 Elias Saliby (1950 being mentioned)

References

External links
Orthodox Diocese of Beirut: who we are

Beirut
Beirut
Lebanese clergy